Gandhinagar is the capital city of the Indian state of Gujarat.

Gandhinagar may also refer to:

 Gandhinagar, Vellore
 Gandhinagar, Dharwad, a neighborhood in Dharwad
 Gandhinagar, Kolhapur, a census town in Kolhapur district, Maharashtra
 Gandhinagar, Palghar, a village in Maharashtra
 Gandhinagar, Tiruvannamalai, a municipality in Thiruvannamalai district, Tamil Nadu
 Gandhinagar, Jammu, neighborhood in Jammu
 Gandhinagar, Jammu, an assembly constituency under Jammu (Lok Sabha constituency), Jammu and Kashmir
 Gandhi Nagar, Bangalore, neighborhood in Bangalore
Gandhi Nagar (Vidhana Sabha constituency), an Assembly constituency in Karnataka, India
 Gandhi Nagar, Mysore, neighborhood in Mysore
 Gandhi Nagar, Chennai, a place in Adyar, Chennai
 Gandhi Nagar, Delhi
Gandhi Nagar (Delhi Assembly constituency), an Assembly constituency in Delhi, India
 Gandhi Nagar, Kochi
 Gandhi Nagar, Sindhanur, a village in Raichur district, Karnataka
 Gandhi Nagar, Great Nicobar
 Gandhi Nagar, Muzaffarnagar, neighborhood in Muzaffarnagar, Uttar Pradesh